Scratchell's Bay is a bay on the south west coast of the Isle of Wight, England just to the south east of The Needles. It faces roughly south towards the English Channel, it is 250m in length and is straight. The name is thought to have come from one of the many names for the Devil.

The beach which is made up mostly of shingle cannot be reached any other way than by boat, as there is no access from the top of the cliff. A small cave is located at the east end of the bay, near Sun Corner.  

The bay is best viewed from either the lookout point near the rocket launching facility or the Needles Old Battery National Trust property on the cliff top.

The wreck of a 19th-century iron-hulled sailing ship called the  lies within the bay.

References

Bays of the Isle of Wight